The S.S.S. (Sea Scout Ship) Lotus is a historic gaff rigged schooner. Her home port is Sodus Bay in Wayne County, New York, United States. She is owned and operated by the "Friends of the Schooner Lotus."

History of Lotus
The keel on Lotus was laid down in 1917 and the boat was completed in 1918, in Rocky River, Ohio. Designed by the naval architect William Hand Jr. in 1916, and christened with the name of Miss Gloucester, she was designed as a pleasure yacht for sailing on the Great Lakes.

As Miss Gloucester, she was commissioned by Thomas B. Van Dorn, to be the Van Dorn family yacht. The Van Dorn family sailed her on Lake Erie and perhaps Lake Huron.

In 1922, the ship was sold to Stephen Estes Comstock of Newark, New York. He moved the ship to Sodus Bay, on Lake Ontario, and renamed her Lotus, after the wild water lilies that grew in the bay.

Lotus was sold again in 1938, to Dick Todd and Ken Cooley. They renamed her again, this time to Dickens, a combination of their first names.

In 1943, Ezra Hale and his partners bought the ship and changed her name back to Lotus. Ezra Hale and  John Trahey donated Lotus to the Otetiana Council of the Boy Scouts of America in 1971, specifying that Sea Explorer Ship (now Sea Scout Ship) 303, chartered by the Kiwanis Club of Webster, New York, be the ones to use it. The Sea Explorer Ship 303 had begun in 1965, and used a variety of power cruisers before the Lotus was donated.

Unfortunately, it was difficult to keep up with the required maintenance and by 1991 Lotus needed serious restoration. With the support of the Kiwanis Club, the money was raised for a restoration, soliciting donations from individuals and corporations. A matching funds grant was also received from New York State, which brought the total amount of money raised to $150,000.

Lotus was trucked to Rivendell Marine, in Rhode Island, in 1991. The refit was completed in 1993. For the following 14 years, Lotus was sailed by members of Sea Scout Ship 303 around all of Lake Ontario. Lotus visited many harbor festivals and reenactments each year including Alexandria Bay Pirate Week, Oswego Harborfest, and reenactments in Sackets Harbor. Lotus has also participated several times in Operation Sail. In 2009 Otetiana Council, BSA and Finger Lakes Council, BSA merged to form Seneca Waterways Council, BSA with operations centered in Rochester, New York.

Present

By the end of the 2017 season, Lotus was in serious need of repair. Declining membership in Sea Scout Ship 303 resulted in the unit becoming dormant and the end of its 50-year charter relationship with the Kiwanis Club of Webster. Later that year, the unit was re-invigorated by a group of sailors and re-chartered under the Newport Yacht Club in Irondequoit, New York, with the understanding that the Seneca Waterways Council would make arrangements for the care of Lotus. Sea Scout Ship 303 and several caring volunteers made attempts to protect her from the elements over the next few years, but with little success. She was in a state of abandonment and deteriorated rapidly.

In 2019 the Seneca Waterways Council Scouting Historical Society began assembling a Lotus and Sea Scout Ship 303 archive. The efforts culminated in a large exhibit at the council office that opened in February 2020. By that time "The Friends of the Schooner Lotus," organized in Sodus Point, New York at the end of 2019, had begun meeting monthly. A Facebook group was created and efforts were begun to obtain ownership of Lotus. A marine survey determined that the value of the schooner was far less than the financial obligation required to store her. By that summer, several setbacks brought on by the COVID-19 pandemic, legal and financial concerns, differences of opinions on restoration methods and other issues involving the owners made it seem like there was no hope of saving Lotus and that she would likely be scrapped by the end of the year.  

On December 14, 2020, an agreement was reached and ownership was transferred to "The Friends of the Schooner Lotus".  With determined efforts of the new owners over the following several days including help from Katlynn Marine, Lotus was prepared for transport. On December 21, 2020, she was trucked to Beacon Bay Marina and Cayuga Wooden Boat Works. Efforts are now underway to raise the funds necessary to begin the lengthy restoration of Lotus.

Specifications

Dimensions

Length:  on deck,  from the tip of the bowsprit to the end of the main boom
Beam: , 3 inches
Draft: , 9 inches
Weight: 16 tons (approximate)
Total Sail Area:

Engine
Yanmar  four cylinder, turbo-charged diesel with sealed heat exchange

Materials
Masts: Sitka Spruce
Frames: Oak
Original Hull Planking: Long-leaf Yellow Pine
Replacement Hull Planking: Mahogany
Main Deck: Vertical-grain Douglas Fir
Cockpit Deck: Long-leaf Yellow Pine
Original Cabin Tops: Canvas

See also
Sea Scouting (Boy Scouts of America)
List of schooners
Charles N. Curtis - Sea Scout Ship 110

References

Memories of the Schooner Lotus
"Loafing on Lotus," by C.P.H. Vary, June 1924 issue of "Yachting"

External links

Photo of the Lotus
Official Ship 303 page on the Sea Scouts website
Rivendell Marine Lotus Restoration, 1991
SSS 303 Lotus Facebook Group, Maintained by the crew

Schooners of the United States
Tall ships of the United States
Youth organizations based in New York (state)
Ships on the National Register of Historic Places in New York (state)
Tourist attractions in Wayne County, New York
Transportation in Wayne County, New York
National Register of Historic Places in Wayne County, New York
Ships built in Ohio
Sea Scouting